Chunia is a genus of flowering plants belonging to the family Hamamelidaceae.

Its native range is Hainan.

Species:
 Chunia bucklandioides H.T.Chang

References

Hamamelidaceae
Saxifragales genera